Salagena guichardi is a moth in the family Cossidae. It is found in Oman and the United Arab Emirates.

References

Natural History Museum Lepidoptera generic names catalog

Metarbelinae
Moths described in 1980